Shengzhou Xinchang railway station is a railway station in Sanjiang Subdistrict, Shengzhou, Shaoxing, Zhejiang Province. It is situated between Shengzhou county-level city and Xinchang County, both under the administration of Shaoxing prefecture-level city.

History 
The station opened with the Hangzhou–Taizhou high-speed railway on 8 January 2022.

Design 
The station has a cross shape, with platforms on both the Hangzhou–Taizhou high-speed railway and the Ningbo–Jinhua railway.

References

Railway stations in China opened in 2022
Railway stations in Zhejiang